Jackie Paterson (5 September 1920 – 19 November 1966) was a Scottish boxer who was world flyweight boxing champion. He was also British champion at flyweight and bantamweight.

Early life
Born in Springside, Ayrshire, Paterson emigrated with his family from Scotland, when he was eight years old, to Scranton, Pennsylvania. He returned to Scotland in his early teens to work at John Brown & Co, shipbuilders on the Clyde. He later worked as a butcher. When he was thirteen, he joined the Anderson Club in Glasgow and began to box as an amateur. He turned professional when he was seventeen.

Boxing style
Paterson was a southpaw with a knockout punch in either hand, his most lethal weapon being his left hook. He was comparatively broadly built for a flyweight, and often struggled to make the eight stone flyweight limit. In the latter stages of his career, he fought as a bantamweight.

Pro career
Paterson's first fight was in May 1938 in Greenock, and he beat Joe Kiely on points over ten rounds.

In his nineteenth fight he won the vacant British flyweight title, beating Paddy Ryan by a knockout in the thirteenth round. The fight was in September 1939, in Glasgow.

With the outbreak of World War II, Paterson joined the RAF, but continued to box regularly throughout the war years. By 1943 his rank had risen to Sergeant.

In March 1940, he added the vacant Empire title to his British one, when he won on points against Richie Kid Tanner in Manchester.

In February 1941, he defended both titles against Paddy Ryan in Nottingham, winning on a technical knockout in the eighth. Nine days later he beat Empire bantamweight champion Jim Brady on points in a non-title fight.

In August 1941, he had a shot at the Brady's Empire bantamweight title in Glasgow. However, he lost on points over fifteen rounds.

World title
In June 1943, Paterson fought former flyweight champion Peter Kane from Golborne in Lancashire for the vacant World flyweight championship. The world title fight, held at Hampden Park in Glasgow, lasted only 61 seconds, as Paterson caught Kane early in the first round putting him down twice, before he was counted out the second time. Paterson was the first southpaw to be world flyweight champion. By successfully defending his British flyweight title twice he had also won a Lonsdale Belt outright. Paterson was subsequently recognised as world champion by the NYSAC.

In September 1943 he suffered his first defeat since May the previous year when he was beaten on points by Len Davies. Paterson was 11.5 pounds overweight at the weigh-in.

In September 1945, Paterson had a re-match with Jim Brady for his Commonwealth bantamweight title, beating him on points in Glasgow, to take the title.

In March 1946, he fought the Frenchman, Theo Medina, for the vacant European bantamweight title. He won the fight, in London on a disqualification in the eighth. Paterson was now World, British and Commonwealth flyweight champion, as well as Commonwealth and European bantamweight champion.

In July 1946, he defended his flyweight titles against Joe Curran in Glasgow, winning on points.

In October 1946, Paterson defended his European bantamweight title against Theo Medina, again in Glasgow. He lost the title when Medina knocked him out in the fourth round.

Recognising that his performance levels were dropping, which he blamed on having insufficient time to train while serving in the RAF, in November 1946, Paterson announced his intention to retire after touring either South Africa or Australia, although he changed his mind and would continue for several more years.

In February 1947, he challenged for the British bantamweight title, held by Johnny King. They fought in King's hometown of Manchester, and Paterson knocked King out in the seventh after putting him down four times in the fight.

In October 1947, he defended his British and Commonwealth bantamweight titles against Welshman, Norman Lewis, at Harringay Arena, London. He scored another knockout, stopping Lewis in the fifth.

Stripped of titles
Paterson was finding it more and more difficult to make the eight stone flyweight limit. In July 1947, he was due to defend his World flyweight title against Dado Marino, but collapsed at the weigh-in after making over-strenuous efforts to lose weight. The result was that the National Boxing Association of America and the British Boxing Board of Control stripped him of his British, Empire, and World titles. Rinty Monaghan of Northern Ireland fought and beat Marino to take the World title, but Paterson took out an injunction against the BBBC to prevent it from recognising Monaghan as champion.

After appealing to the Board, his titles were reinstated in November 1947, and he was ordered to defend against Monaghan.

Eventually, in March 1948, Paterson and Monaghan met in Belfast to decide the matter. Paterson had to lose 4 lbs 12 oz in a week to meet the eight stone limit. As a result, he was dehydrated and weakened. Monaghan knocked him down in the second round and Paterson retired at the end the seventh with a cut over his eye, Monaghan taking the World, British and Empire titles.

Remaining career
After losing his flyweight titles to Monaghan, Paterson still held the British and Commonwealth bantamweight titles. However his career was going downhill rapidly.

In March 1949, he defended his titles in Liverpool against Stan Rowan, losing on points over fifteen rounds.

In December 1949 he challenged Empire champion Vic Toweel in Johannesburg, losing on points.

His final twelve fights resulted in nine defeats and only three wins. He retired in 1950 but later that year announced his intention to make a comeback. His last fight was in February 1951, in Dundee and was an eight-round points defeat by Willie Miles.

Retirement and death
In his professional career Paterson had earned an estimated £50,000.

After retiring, he moved to Detroit in 1951, before living in South Africa for several years, running hotels. He briefly came back to Britain, but returned to South Africa in December 1965 and began working as a lorry driver in Durban. In 1966, Paterson was stabbed in the throat during a fight after a drinking session, and died at the age of 46.

Professional boxing record

See also
 List of flyweight boxing champions
 List of British bantamweight boxing champions
 List of left-handed boxers
 List of British flyweight boxing champions

References

External links
 
 Maurice Golesworthy, Encyclopaedia of Boxing (Eighth Edition) (1988), Robert Hale Limited, 
 Jackie Paterson: World Champion 1943 BBC – A Sporting Nation
Jackie Paterson – CBZ Profile
https://titlehistories.com/boxing/wba/wba-world-fl.html

1920 births
1966 deaths
Scottish male boxers
Flyweight boxers
Bantamweight boxers
World boxing champions
World flyweight boxing champions
Royal Air Force airmen
Royal Air Force personnel of World War II